The 1 Broadway–Seventh Avenue Local is a rapid transit service in the A Division of the New York City Subway. Its route emblem, or "bullet", is colored , since it uses the IRT Broadway–Seventh Avenue Line for its entire route.

The 1 operates at all times, making all stops between Van Cortlandt Park–242nd Street in Riverdale, Bronx and South Ferry in Lower Manhattan.

The modern 1 train has always run up to Van Cortlandt Park in the Bronx, but its route below 96th Street has varied through the years. Initially, there were two main service patterns south of 96th Street: a local service to South Ferry in Manhattan, and an express service to Brooklyn. The express service was discontinued in 1959. From 1989 to 2005, the 1 ran in a skip-stop service pattern during rush hours, with the 9 providing the complementary skip-stop service on the same route. The 1 and 9 trains were rerouted after the September 11 attacks in 2001; although they had mostly resumed their normal route by 2002, the 1 train skipped the Cortlandt Street station until 2018.

Service history

Early service 

When the New York City Subway began operation between 1904 and 1908, one of the main service patterns was the West Side Branch, which the modern 1 train uses. Trains ran from Lower Manhattan to the 242nd Street station near Van Cortlandt Park, using what is now the IRT Lexington Avenue Line, 42nd Street Shuttle, and IRT Broadway–Seventh Avenue Line. There was both local and express service with express trains using the express tracks south of 96th Street. Some express trains ran to Atlantic Avenue in Brooklyn via the Joralemon Street Tunnel during rush hours while all other trains terminated at City Hall or the South Ferry outer loop.

On November 15, 1906, a petition with 20,000 signatures was sent to the Rapid Transit Commission to request the restoration of express service on the third track north of 96th Street. Residents of Inwood, Marble Hill, and Kingsbridge joined Washington Heights residents in requesting this service to speed their commutes. After receiving that petition, on November 16, the Rapid Transit Commission ordered the Interborough Rapid Transit Company (IRT) to extend express service from 96th Street to 137th Street in three days. Limited express service was inaugurated on November 19, 1906, operating daily, except Sundays and holidays, between 7:20 and 8:58 a.m. and 4:54 and 6:18 p.m. to and from 181st Street. Only expresses starting and ending at Kingsbridge would run express in this section-expresses from 168th Street would make local stops in this section. The Kingsbridge express trains would have two red signal markets on the top of the front motor car and a red lantern carried on the front end of the train the center of the car platform. The previous schedule had local and express trains both running every four minutes south of Kingsbridge, while the new schedule had express trains running every 8 minutes on the express track north of 96th Street, and local trains running every eight minutes. The number of local trains south of 96th Street did not change, with half of express trains becoming locals at this point. Waits at local stations north of 96th Street were ten minutes. In December 1906, the IRT prepared plans to relieve overcrowding on the platforms at 96th Street and train congestion at the station. To reduce the significant number of people transferring between people taking Lenox Avenue Line locals and Broadway express trains, the IRT planned to have Broadway express trains pass through the station without stopping. This would force people wanting to take Lenox Avenue Line trains to do so further down the line without needing to transfer, allowing trains to move through 96th Street more quickly.

In 1906, some of the local trains that started at 168th Street in the morning bypassed 157th Street without stopping.

On January 23, 1911, ten-car express trains began running on the Lenox Avenue Line, and the following day, ten-car express trains were inaugurated on the West Side Line.

On June 3, 1917, the first portion of the Broadway–Seventh Avenue Line south of Times Square–42nd Street (to 34th Street–Penn Station) opened. A separate shuttle service between Times Square and 34th Street was placed into service as well. On July 1, 1918, this shuttle was extended south to South Ferry, with a shorter shuttle on the Brooklyn branch between Chambers Street and Wall Street. Finally, the new "H" system was implemented on August 1, 1918, joining the two halves of the Broadway–Seventh Avenue Line and sending all West Side trains south from Times Square. Local trains (Broadway and Lenox Avenue) were sent to South Ferry, while express trains (Broadway and West Farms) used the new Clark Street Tunnel to Brooklyn.

On January 16, 1928, the New York State Transit Commission announced that it had reached an agreement with the IRT to increase service on its lines by 8,000,000 car miles a year–the greatest increase since 1922. As part of the changes, on January 30, all 242nd Street trains started running to New Lots Avenue. This change eliminated the splitting of trains at Brooklyn Museum, with the first half going to New Lots Avenue and the second half to Flatbush Avenue. In addition, the span of rush hour service on both Broadway–Seventh Avenue locals and expresses was increased.

On January 25, 1931, the start time for southbound split train operation was changed from 1 p.m. to 9 a.m. passing Franklin Avenue in order to increase the frequency of service to Flatbush Avenue and New Lots Avenue from every sixteen minutes to every eight minutes.

As of 1934, all express 1 trains were running from 242nd Street to New Lots Avenue weekdays and Saturdays during the day, alternating between New Lots and Flatbush Avenues evenings and Sunday afternoons, and were split at Brooklyn Museum on Sunday morning with the first half going to New Lots Avenue and the second half to Flatbush Avenue. All local 1 trains ran from 137th Street (extended to Dyckman Street during rush hours) to South Ferry days and evenings, and 242nd Street to either New Lots or Flatbush Avenues during late nights (from midnight to 5:30 a.m.).

On September 5, 1937, the practice of splitting Sunday morning trains at Brooklyn Museum was discontinued, with the alternate trains going to New Lots Avenue or Flatbush Avenue. Trains were cut from being 10-car trains to 7-car trains. On July 1, 1938, all evening and Sunday trains were rerouted to New Lots Avenue. By 1945, all local 1 trains were cut back from Dyckman Street to 137th Street during peak periods.

Beginning on May 10, 1946, all 1 trains in Brooklyn ran express during late nights, with service running every twelve minutes. Previously all 1 trains ran local from 12:30 to 5:30 am and they alternated between Flatbush and New Lots Avenues. On December 20, 1946, all late night trains were routed to Flatbush Avenue, while Sunday service still alternated between Flatbush and New Lots Avenues.

The IRT routes were given numbered designations with the introduction of "R-type" rolling stock, which contained rollsigns with numbered designations for each service. The first such fleet, the R12, was put into service in 1948. The Broadway route to 242nd Street became known as the 1.

On June 12, 1949, 137th Street to South Ferry Sunday local trains were discontinued, but were resumed on March 5, 1950, at which time Sunday service was also rerouted to New Lots Avenue. On March 15, 1954, weekend 137th Street to South Ferry local trains were once again discontinued, and simultaneously weekend Brooklyn trains were rerouted to Flatbush Avenue.

An attempt was made to extend express service further north on January 14, 1955, when Broadway express trains, or every other 1 train, began running express between 137th and 96th Streets in the peak direction, between 7:32 and 8:33 a.m., and between 5:10 and 5:59 p.m.. Express trains terminated at 242nd Street.

On January 17, 1955, the bottleneck at 96th Street forced some southbound 1 trains that ran express south of 96th Street to remain on the local track at 96th Street, skipping local stops before switching to the express track at 72nd Street.

Broadway express service between 137th and 96th Street proved unsuccessful, and ended on June 28, 1956. Meanwhile, in Brooklyn, weekday trains were rerouted to Flatbush Avenue and evening 137th Street to South Ferry local trains were discontinued.

West Side improvement 
Under a $100-million rebuilding program, increased and lengthened service was implemented during peak hours on the 1 train. Trains then stopped using the switches north of 96th Street, except for General Orders, when temporary construction-related service diversions were in effect. Once most of the work on the project was completed on February 6, 1959, all 1 trains became local, running at an increased frequency, and all 2 and 3 trains became express, and eight-car local trains began operation. 1 trains began to run between 242nd Street and South Ferry at all times. Trains began to be branded as Hi-Speed Locals, being as fast as the old express service with new R21 and R22 subway cars on the route. During rush hours in the peak direction, alternate trains from 242nd Street only stopped at 168th Street while running express from Dyckman to 137th Streets in the direction of heavy traffic. The bypassed stations were served by locals originating from Dyckman Street. By Marcy 26, 1959, 15,000 riders switched from using express trains to the Hi-Speed Locals during rush hours, increasing riders on local trains south of 96th Street by 75 percent.

Evening rush local/express service was discontinued on February 2, 1959. Morning rush hour express service was revised on January 8, 1962, with express trains stopping at 191st Street and 181st Street, and skipping 215th Street and 207th Street. This express service was discontinued on May 24, 1976, after which all 1 trains began to make all stops.

Skip-stop implementation 
In April 1988, the New York City Transit Authority (NYCTA) unveiled plans to speed up service on the Broadway-Seventh Avenue Line through the implementation of skip-stop service. As soon as the plan was announced, some local officials were opposed to the change. Initially, skip-stop service would have been operated north of 116th Street, with the 1 service skipping 125th Street, 157th Street, 207th Street, and 225th Street, and a new numbered 9 service skipping 145th Street, 181st Street, Dyckman Street, 215th Street and 238th Street. As part of the study that resulted in the skip-stop plan, the NYCTA studied using the center track for express service. However, the agency settled on skip-stop service because the center track existed in two discontinuous segments, which would require complicated track-switching maneuvers to accommodate the express trains. Most passengers would not have to wait longer for a train: previously, one-third of 1 trains had terminated at 137th Street, but under the new service pattern, these trains would run the full route to 242nd Street instead. Previously, stations north of 137th Street were served by a train every 10 minutes. At stations served by only one of the skip-stop services, the maximum wait was to be 10 minutes, while at stations served by all trains, the maximum wait would be 5 minutes.

In July 1988, it was announced that the 1/9 skip-stop service would begin on August 29, 1988. Skip-stop service was expected to speed up travel times for almost half of riders north of 96th Street. In August 1988, the NYCTA postponed plans for 1/9 skip-stop service due to public opposition. NYCTA officials recognized that they did not do a good job informing the community, and indicated that they planned to continue to look into it. Plans to implement skip-stop service on the IRT Pelham Line, which were contingent on the success of 1/9 skip-stop, were indefinitely postponed. In September 1988, the MTA Board formally voted to defer implementation of 1/9 skip-stop service for these reasons. NYCTA planned to initiate outreach in January 1989 and implement the change at some point later that year. In October 1988, the NYCTA informed local communities that it planned to implement skip-stop the following spring. However, residents of Inwood and Washington Heights were particularly opposed to the change, since most stops in these neighborhoods would be skipped by one of the two routes, and since they had not been included in the planning process.

In March 1989, the NYCTA stated that there was no set date for the implementation of the plan, with service possibly starting as late as the fall. To convince local communities, it set up meetings with residents and distributed leaflets advertising the change. In attempt to win their favor, they changed the name of the service from skip-stop to express service.

A public hearing on the NYCTA's plan for skip-stop service was held on June 27, 1989. The goals of skip-stop service were to extend all trips to 242nd Street, to provide faster travel times for a majority of riders, and to improve service reliability through evenly loaded and spaced trains. During 1987 and 1988, analysis was conducted to determine various options for express service along the 1, including using the center express track. As part of the plan, express service was to operate weekdays between 6:30 a.m. and 7 p.m. Trips that ended at 137th Street were extended to 242nd Street, which eliminated the need for a significant reduction in service levels at local stops. The 125th Street station, which is located south of 137th Street, would have experienced a reduction in service. The location of all-stop stations and skip-stop stations was done to evenly distribute passengers between the 1 and the 9, and to accommodate reverse commuting patterns. Stops with ridership greater than 8,000 daily passengers were designated all-stop stations, while less patronized stops were served by either 1 or 9 trains. One change was made from the 1988 plan: due to community input 181st Street was added as an all-stop station. Express service was expected to save up to  minutes of travel time, while all-stop stations would see an additional -minute reduction in waiting time. This would save between six and nine minutes or a 19% travel time reduction. Running express service via the center track was dismissed since the track had not been designed for express service. The track south of 145th Street is not long enough to allow an express train to pass a local, resulting in merging delays at 103rd Street which would eliminate any time saved. In addition, the busiest stops on the route north of 96th Street would be bypassed without any time savings. Extending all-local service to 242nd Street or adding additional trains were dismissed since they would require additional subway cars, which were not available at the time.

On July 28, 1989, the MTA Board approved a revised 1/9 skip-stop plan unanimously, with the plan scheduled to take effect on August 21, 1989. Unlike the original plan, 1 trains would skip 145th Street, 191st Street, 207th Street and 225th Street, while 9 trains would skip 157th Street, Dyckman Street, 215th Street and 238th Street.

Beginning at 6:30 a.m. on Monday, August 21, 1989, the services were coordinated as the 1/9 and both ran between Van Cortlandt Park–242nd Street and South Ferry. The plan was to have skip-stop service begin north of 116th Street–Columbia University, but due to objections, most notably that riders did not want 125th Street to be a skip-stop station, skip-stop service was only implemented north of 137th Street–City College between the hours of 6:30 am and 7:00 pm weekdays. All 1 trains skipped Marble Hill–225th, 207th, 191st and 145th Streets, while all 9 trains skipped 238th, 215th, Dyckman and 157th Streets. On September 4, 1994, midday skip-stop service was discontinued, and 191st Street became a common station for skip-stop service.

9/11 and recovery 
After the September 11 attacks in 2001, 1 trains had to be rerouted since the IRT Broadway–Seventh Avenue Line ran directly under the World Trade Center site and was heavily damaged in the collapse of the Twin Towers. It initially ran as a shuttle alongside the 2 and 3 trains to Times Square, due to debris that fell on the tracks south of Pennsylvania Station. When the debris was cleared by September 17, the 1 ran only between 242nd Street and 14th Street, making local stops north of 96th Street and express stops south of that point. Local service was replaced by the 2 and 3 trains, running express from Canal Street to Fulton Street due to debris covering the stops between them. The skip-stop service with the 9 train was suspended for the duration of the 9/11 emergency service plan. On September 19, after a few switching delays at 96th Street, service was changed. 1 trains made all stops at all times from 242nd Street to New Lots Avenue via the Clark Street Tunnel and IRT Eastern Parkway Line, replacing the route of 3 trains within Brooklyn, as the 3 terminated at 14th Street during this period. All 1 trains continued running express with the 2 between the aforementioned streets until October 1, when it terminated at Chambers Street in Manhattan overnight.

Over the next year, the section of the Broadway–Seventh Avenue Line's South Ferry spur south of Chambers Street was cleaned and the tunnel was rebuilt through the World Trade Center site. The tunnel was completed and opened to service on September 15, 2002, when 1 trains returned to the South Ferry Loop and 9 skip-stop service was reinstated. However, the Cortlandt Street station, which was directly underneath the World Trade Center, was demolished as part of the clean-up and was rebuilt as part of the World Trade Center Transportation Hub until September 8, 2018, when it reopened as WTC Cortlandt.

Elimination of skip stop service  

On April 27, 2004, it was announced that New York City Transit was considering eliminating 9 service, and thus, the skip-stop pattern. By that time, riders at skip-stop stations were experiencing longer wait times, and fewer riders were benefiting from the service pattern overall. The MTA estimated that eliminating skip-stop service only added  to 3 minutes of travel time for passengers at the northernmost stations at 242nd Street and 238th Street, while many passengers would see trains frequencies double, resulting in decreased overall travel time because of less time waiting for trains. Though the MTA had planned to vote on the future of the skip-stop service in summer 2004, it approved the change on January 11, 2005. The 9 train was discontinued on May 27, 2005, and the 1 now makes all stops on the IRT Broadway–Seventh Avenue Line.

Present day  

On March 16, 2009, the new South Ferry station opened, replacing the original loop station. However, Hurricane Sandy flooded the station, requiring it to be shut down for repairs. Rector Street served as a temporary terminal for the 1 until April 4, 2013. when the 1 returned to the reopened loop station. The old loop station then served as a temporary terminal until the replacement South Ferry station reopened on June 27, 2017.

Route

Service pattern 
The 1 uses the following line with the same service pattern at all times.

Stations 
The 1 runs on the IRT Broadway–Seventh Avenue Line in its entirety.

Notes

References

External links 

 MTA NYC Transit – 1 Broadway – Seventh Avenue Local
 
 

New York City Subway services